B430 was an Australian travel television program on Channel [V]. It was based on 10 locations to visit before turning 30. It was hosted by Danny Clayton, Renee Bargh, Jane Gazzo, Kyle Linahan, Brendan Maclean, James Kerley and Billy Russell.

See also

References

2009 Australian television series debuts
2010s Australian television series
Australian travel television series
English-language television shows
Channel V Australia original programming